Kondaj may refer to:
 Kandej
 Kundaj